Badebhoun is a Sunni Muslim village in Koura District of Lebanon.

References 

Populated places in the North Governorate
Koura District
Sunni Muslim communities in Lebanon